Streetnoise is a 1969 album by Julie Driscoll, Brian Auger and the Trinity, originally released as a double LP.

It includes cover versions of The Doors’ "Light My Fire", Nina Simone’s "Take Me To The Water", Laura Nyro’s "Save the Country", Miles Davis' "All Blues", Richie Havens' "Indian Rope Man", and "Let The Sunshine In" and "I Got Life" from the musical Hair. Driscoll covers this wide range of musical influences easily and with her highly emotive and distinctive vocals, and with Auger's intense Hammond organ, the album is instrumentally interesting, too.

Track listing

LP side 1
sub-titled: HOW GOOD WOULD IT BE TO FEEL FREE
1.	"Tropic of Capricorn" (Brian Auger) 5:30
2.	"Czechoslovakia" (Julie Driscoll) 6:45
3.	"Take Me to the Water"	(Nina Simone)	4:00
4.	"A Word About Colour"	(Julie Driscoll)	1:35

LP side 2
sub-titled: KISS HIM QUICK, HE HAS TO PART
5.	"Light My Fire"	(John Densmore, Robby Krieger, Ray Manzarek, Jim Morrison)	4:30
6.	"Indian Rope Man"	(Richie Havens, Joe Price, Mark Roth)	3:00
7.	"When I Was a Young Girl"	(Traditional; arranged by Julie Driscoll)	7:00
8.	"The Flesh Failures (Let the Sunshine In)"	(James Rado, Gerome Ragni, Galt MacDermot)	3:05

LP side 3
sub-titled: LOOKING IN THE EYE OF THE WORLD
9.	"Ellis Island"	(Brian Auger)	4:10
10.	"In Search of the Sun" (Dave Ambrose)	4:25
11.	"Finally Found You Out" (Brian Auger)	4:15
12.	"Looking in the Eye of the World" (Brian Auger)	5:05

LP side 4
sub-titled: SAVE THE COUNTRY
13.	"Vauxhall to Lambeth Bridge" (Julie Driscoll)	6:30
14.	"All Blues"	(Miles Davis, Oscar Brown)	5:40
15.	"I've Got Life" (James Rado, Gerome Ragni, Galt MacDermot)	4:30
16.	"Save the Country" (Laura Nyro)	3:56

Personnel 
 Brian "Auge" Auger - B-3 organ, piano, electric piano, vocals
 Julie "Jools" Driscoll - lead vocals, acoustic guitar
 David "Lobs" Ambrose - 4- and 6- string electric basses, acoustic guitar, vocals
 Clive "Toli" Thacker - drums, percussion

References

External links 
 BBC - Classic Pop/Rock Review - Brian Auger Julie Driscoll & The Trinity, Open, Definitely What!, Streetnoise

1969 albums
Julie Driscoll albums
Brian Auger albums
Progressive rock albums by English artists
Jazz fusion albums by English artists
Albums produced by Giorgio Gomelsky
Polydor Records albums
Collaborative albums